Osama Youssef Kashmoula was a governor of Mosul who was killed in an attack in 2004. Kashmoula was assaulted between the cities of Beiji and Tikrit, north of Baghdad, as he went to the capital. Insurgents had repeatedly attacked local officials, who were seen as being collaborators with American forces, but who had not a killed an official as senior as Kashmoula since the assassinations of Iraq's most senior career diplomat and a top Education Ministry official.

References

Iraqi politicians
Year of birth missing
2004 deaths
Assassinated Iraqi politicians